The 2017–18 Eintracht Frankfurt season was the 119th season in the football club's history and 6th consecutive and 49th overall season in the top flight of German football, the Bundesliga, having been promoted from the 2. Bundesliga in 2012. In addition to the domestic league, Eintracht Frankfurt also were participating in this season's edition of the domestic cup, the DFB-Pokal. This was the 93rd season for Frankfurt in the Commerzbank-Arena, located in Frankfurt, Hesse, Germany. The season covers a period from 1 July 2017 to 30 June 2018.

The season ended up with Eintracht winning the DFB-Pokal for the fifth time.

Players

Squad information

Transfers

In

Out

Friendly matches

Competitions

Overview

Bundesliga

League table

Results summary

Results by round

Matches

DFB-Pokal

Statistics

Appearances and goals

|-
! colspan=14 style=background:#dcdcdc; text-align:center| Goalkeepers

|-
! colspan=14 style=background:#dcdcdc; text-align:center| Defenders

|-
! colspan=14 style=background:#dcdcdc; text-align:center| Midfielders

|-
! colspan=14 style=background:#dcdcdc; text-align:center| Forwards

|-
! colspan=14 style=background:#dcdcdc; text-align:center| Players transferred out during the season

Goalscorers

Last updated: 19 May 2018

Clean sheets

Last updated: 19 May 2018

Disciplinary record

Last updated: 19 May 2018

References

Eintracht Frankfurt seasons
Frankfurt, Eintracht